Zygaena ignifera is a species of moth in the Zygaenidae family. It is found in Spain.

References

Moths described in 1897
Zygaena
Moths of Europe